Events from the year 1987 in China.

Incumbents 
 General Secretary of the Chinese Communist Party: Hu Yaobang
 President: Li Xiannian
 Premier: Zhao Ziyang
 Chairman: Deng Yingchao 
 Vice President: Ulanhu
 Vice Premier: Wan Li

Governors  
 Governor of Anhui Province – Wang Yuzhao then Lu Rongjing 
 Governor of Fujian Province – Hu Ping then Wang Zhaoguo 
 Governor of Gansu Province – Chen Guangyi then Jia Zhijie
 Governor of Guangdong Province – Ye Xuanping 
 Governor of Guizhou Province – Wang Zhaowen
 Governor of Hebei Province – Xie Feng then Yue Qifeng 
 Governor of Heilongjiang Province – Hou Jie 
 Governor of Henan Province – He Zhukang then Cheng Weigao 
 Governor of Hubei Province – Guo Zhenqian  
 Governor of Hunan Province – Xiong Qingquan 
 Governor of Jiangsu Province – Gu Xiulian 
 Governor of Jiangxi Province – Wu Guanzheng  
 Governor of Jilin Province – Gao Dezhan then He Zhukang 
 Governor of Liaoning Province – Li Changchun 
 Governor of Qinghai Province – Song Ruixiang then Jin Jipeng  
 Governor of Shaanxi Province – Zhang Boxing then Hou Zongbin
 Governor of Shandong Province – Li Chang'an then Jiang Chunyun 
 Governor of Shanxi Province – Wang Senhao 
 Governor of Sichuan Province – Jiang Minkuan (until January), Zhang Haoruo (starting February)
 Governor of Yunnan Province – Li Jiating 
 Governor of Zhejiang Province – Xue Ju (until January), Shen Zulun (starting February)

Events 

 1987 Sino-Indian skirmish
 7th Golden Rooster Awards
 Black Dragon Fire
 13th Politburo of the Chinese Communist Party
 13th National Congress of the Chinese Communist Party
 Joint Declaration on the Question of Macau
 Huawei was founded in Shenzhen.
 Hangzhou Wahaha Group was founded.
September 25 – China CITIC Bank was founded.

Births 
 January 6 – Zhang Lin, swimmer
 March 27 – Yuan Jing, sport shooter
 April 8 – Tianwa Yang, classical violinist
 April 22 – Lou Yue, ice hockey player
 August 20 – Hao Jialu, fencer
 December 15 – Luo Xi, synchronised swimmer

Deaths 

 Li Hanhun, military general (b. 1895)
 Li Fang-Kuei, linguist (b. 1902)
 Gu Zhutong, military general (b. 1893)
 Yang Bozhen, diplomat (b. 1919)

See also 
Timeline of Chinese history
 1987 in Chinese film

References